SR 89 or Sr-89 may refer to:
Strontium-89, a radioactive isotope of strontium
State Route 89, a state highway numbered 89